Matteo Gladig (1880, Triest – 1915, Ljubljana) was an Italian chess master.

Born in Triest (then Austria-Hungary Empire), he won at Triest 1905 (torneo sociale della Società Scacchistica Triestina), took 2nd, behind Giovanni Martinolich, at Triest 1909 (campionato della SST), and drew a short match with Oldřich Duras (+1 –1 =2) at Triest 1909. He won, ahead of Stefano Rosselli del Turco and Arturo Reggio, at Rome 1911 (unofficial Italian Chess Championship, V Torneo dell'Unione Scacchistica Italiana).

During World War I, he – as an Austrian citizen of Italian origin – did not want to fight for an Austrian Army on the Italian Front. Finally, he was captured and tried in Laibach (Ljubljana, then Austria-Hungary) where he died.

References

1880 births
1915 deaths
Italian chess players
Sportspeople from Trieste
19th-century chess players
Civilians killed in World War I